33 Shiroor  is a village in the southern state of Karnataka, India. It is located on the banks of the Seetha River in the Udupi taluk of Udupi district, Karnataka.

See also
 Udupi
 Districts of Karnataka

References

External links
 http://Udupi.nic.in/

Villages in Udupi district